Kealia Ohai Watt (born Kealia Mae Ohai; January 31, 1992) is an American soccer player who is currently a free agent, who most recently played for the Chicago Red Stars of the National Women's Soccer League (NWSL) from 2020-2021. She previously played for the Houston Dash from 2014 to 2019.

Watt has represented the United States on the  under-17,  under-20,  under-23 and senior national teams. She scored the winning goal in the final match of the 2012 FIFA U-20 Women's World Cup.

Early life 
Watt was born to Ben and Cindy Ohai and raised in Draper, Utah. Her sister, Megan, is a former youth national team member who played soccer at USC where she won the 2007 NCAA championship. She is part Hawaiian on her father's side. Her parents named her after Kealia Beach on the island of Kauai.

Watt, who graduated from Alta High School in June 2010, was a four-year varsity soccer player at the school. She led the team to four straight state soccer championships from 2006 to 2009. She was a two-time Gatorade state player of the year, three-time first-team high school All-America, three-time All-State selection, three-time 5A soccer MVP, and the 2010 NSCAA National High School Player of the year. In June 2010, she earned Parade All-American honors.

As a youth, Watt also played club soccer for the Utah Avalanche. With the team, she won four state titles.

Career

College

North Carolina Tar Heels, 2010–2013 
A four-year starter with the Tar Heels from 2010 to 2013, Watt was a member of the 2012 championship-winning team. She was named the tournament's most outstanding offensive player after scoring the game-winning goal during overtime in the semi-final and the first goal of the final in the second minute of the match.

Following her freshman year playing for the Tar Heels, Watt was named to the First-Team All-Atlantic Coast Conference (ACC) and ACC All-Freshman Team. She led the team in scoring with 14 goals and started 22 of the team's 24 games. During her sophomore year, she started in all 20 games in which she played. She scored six goals, including a team high of 3 game-winning goals and served six assists. In her third year with the Tar Heels, Ohai led the team in points (23) and goals (9).

Club

Houston Dash, 2014–2019

Watt was selected as the second overall pick in the 2014 NWSL College Draft by the Houston Dash as the expansion team's very first college draft pick. Of her draft selection, Dash head coach Randy Waldrum said, "I couldn't have asked for things to fall into place so well. It was an amazing day for the Dash. Starting with the selection of Kealia Ohai, we got one of the nation's best forwards. She has great pace, is extremely athletic, and can really stretch defenses with her speed."

She became the club's captain midway through the 2016 season, which coincided with a scoring streak which saw her net 11 goals in 10 games. Watt was named NWSL Player of the Week for weeks 15 and 17. She finished the season tied with Lynn Williams for the golden boot, Williams was given the award as she had more assists. Watt was named to the 2016 NWSL Best XI.

In 2017, Watt scored two goals in 10 games before tearing her ACL on June 24 in a game against the Orlando Pride. This injury would force her to miss the remainder of the 2017 season.

Watt returned to the field on April 22, 2018, against the Orlando Pride. In 2018 she appeared in 19 games and scored 5 goals.

Chicago Red Stars, 2020–2021
On January 6, 2020, Watt was traded to the Chicago Red Stars in exchange for defender Katie Naughton and the 18th overall selection in the 2020 NWSL College Draft.

International

A member of the U.S. youth national programs from the age of 13, Watt has played with the under-15, under-17, under-18, under-20, and the under-23 teams. As a member of the 2012 US U-20 Women's National Team, she won the 2012 FIFA U-20 Women's World Cup and  scored the game-winning goal in the 44th minute of the final to lead the U.S. to victory over Germany.

Watt made her international debut for the senior team on October 23, 2016, against Switzerland in a friendly match in Minneapolis. She scored 48 seconds after entering the match as a substitute in the 81st minute, setting a record for the fastest goal in a US women's national team debut. She received a call-up in July 2018 to the team's training camp for the 2018 Tournament of Nations, her first call-up since injuring her knee in 2017, but did not make the final roster for the tournament.

Personal life
Watt is legally blind in her right eye. Her brother-in-law is former NFL Houston Texans player Brian Cushing.

In October 2016, Watt confirmed that she was in a relationship with NFL player J. J. Watt, retired defensive end for the Arizona Cardinals and previously the Houston Texans. They became engaged in May 2019. They were married on February 15, 2020, in the Bahamas, and Watt subsequently began using her married name. On October 23, 2022, Watt gave birth to her and J. J.’s first child, Koa James Watt.

Career statistics

Club

Honours

North Carolina Tar Heels women's soccer team

 NCAA Division I Women's Soccer Championship: 2012 

Chicago Red Stars
NWSL Challenge Cup runner-up: 2020
NWSL Championship runner-up: 2021

United States U20

 CONCACAF Women's U-20 Championship: 2012  
FIFA U-20 Women's World Cup: 2012

See also
 List of University of North Carolina at Chapel Hill alumni
 List of American and Canadian soccer champions
 List of Senior CLASS Award women's soccer winners

References

External links

 
 US Soccer player profile
 North Carolina player profile
 Kealia Ohai profile at Houston Dash

Living people
1992 births
People from Draper, Utah
American women's soccer players
Chicago Red Stars players
North Carolina Tar Heels women's soccer players
Houston Dash players
National Women's Soccer League players
Parade High School All-Americans (girls' soccer)
Soccer players from Utah
Sportspeople with a vision impairment
Women's association football defenders
Women's association football midfielders
Women's association football forwards
United States women's international soccer players
Houston Dash draft picks
United States women's under-20 international soccer players
American people of Native Hawaiian descent